The Kingdom Of Jones is the second 7" EP by indie rock band The Grifters. Shangri-La Records re-released the first two Grifters singles in 1996 as The Doink Years 10" and again on CD in 2006. The song "Snake Oil" features the debut of Stan Gallimore on drums, establishing the Grifters as four-piece for the rest of their career.

Track listing

Album credits

Grifters
 Stan Gallimore
 Tripp Lamkins
 David Shouse
 Scott Taylor

Grifters (band) albums
1991 EPs